De Morgen (Dutch for The Morning) is a Flemish newspaper with a circulation of 53,860. The paper is published in Antwerp, Belgium.

History and profile
The Vooruit was founded in Ghent by Edward Anseele and appeared the first time on 31 August 1884, just before the foundation of the Belgian Labour Party (Dutch: Belgische Werklieden Partij) in 1885. 

De Morgen was modelled on French daily Liberation. The paper is published by De Persgroep which also publishes Het Laatste Nieuws.

De Morgen presents itself as an independent and progressive newspaper and a more dynamic alternative to its two competitors in the Flemish market, De Standaard and De Tijd. On the other hand, the paper is described as a leftist and socialistic publication. According to the former editor-in-chief , the Flemish press was "de-pillarized" under the influence of De Morgen. 

The paper has won several prizes for its revolutionary lay-out. It has applied advanced printing technology to be able to print with greener, water-based ink and higher quality paper.

Circulation
The 2002 circulation of De Morgen was 68,359 copies. Its market share in the same year was 5.4%. The circulation of De Morgen was 57,248 copies in 2008. During the first quarter of 2009 the paper had a circulation of 76,439 copies. Its total circulation was 58,496 copies in 2009. It was 55,973 copies in 2010 and 55,936 copies in 2011.

References

External links

Newspapers in the class room  

1978 establishments in Belgium
Ark Prize of the Free Word winners
Dutch-language newspapers published in Belgium
Newspapers published in Brussels
Newspapers established in 1978
Socialist newspapers